Joli bébé is a song by Naza and Niska released in 2020.

Charts

Weekly charts

Year-end charts

Certifications

References

French songs
2020 singles
2020 songs